Edward L. Cahn (February 12, 1899 – August 25, 1963) was an American film director and editor.

Early life and education 
Cahn was born in Brooklyn, New York. He went to work at Universal Pictures in 1917 while still a student at UCLA.

Career 
He is best known for directing Our Gang comedies from 1939 to 1943, and a long line of other short subjects and B-movies afterward. He is also known for directing the 1958 film It! The Terror from Beyond Space, the film that inspired the 1979 film Alien. He made a number of films for American International Pictures.

Personal life 
His brother was film editor Philip Cahn, who was the father of film editor Dann Cahn, who, in turn, was the father of film editor Daniel T. Cahn.

Selected filmography as director

The Homicide Squad (1931)
Radio Patrol (1932) 
Law and Order (1932)
Afraid to Talk (1932)
Laughter in Hell (1933)
Emergency Call (1933)
Confidential (1935)
Death Drives Through (1935)
Hit and Run Driver (1935)
A Thrill for Thelma (1935)
Foolproof (1936)
The Perfect Set-up (1936)
Behind the Headlines (1936)
Servant of the People:  The Story of the Constitution of the United States (1937)
Bad Guy (1937)
Grid Rules (1938)
Dad for a Day (1939)
The Giant of Norway (1939)
Angel of Mercy (1939)
Alfalfa's Double (1939)
Time Out for Lessons (1939)
Redhead (1941)
Main Street After Dark (1945)
Dangerous Partners (1945)
 Gas House Kids in Hollywood (1947)
Experiment Alcatraz (1950) (and producer)
Destination Murder (1950)
Creature with the Atom Brain (1955)
Girls in Prison (1956)
Zombies of Mora Tau (1957)
Invasion of the Saucer Men (1957)
Curse of the Faceless Man (1958)
It! The Terror from Beyond Space (1958)
Pier 5, Havana (1958)
The Four Skulls of Jonathan Drake (1959)
 Inside the Mafia (1959)
Invisible Invaders (1959)
A Dog's Best Friend (1959)
 Operation Bottleneck (1961)
 Beauty and the Beast (1962)

Editor
 Surrender (1927)
 The Man Who Laughs (1928)
 Broadway (1929) (associate editor)
 The White Hell of Pitz Palu (1929)
 The Last Performance (1929)
 All Quiet on the Western Front (1930)

References

External links 
 

1899 births
1963 deaths
Cahn
Film directors from New York City
Horror film directors
Science fiction film directors